Medveja is a commune in Briceni District, Moldova. It is composed of two villages, Medveja and Slobozia-Medveja.

References

Communes of Briceni District